Henk Grim (born 1 April 1962) is a Dutch former professional footballer who played for De Treffers, NEC, Den Bosch and AZ, as a striker. After retiring as a player, he later worked as a scout, working at NEC between 1997 and 2012, rising to become head scout. He became head scout at De Treffers in 2015, combining that position with a role at German club FC St. Pauli.

References

1962 births
Living people
Dutch footballers
De Treffers players
NEC Nijmegen players
FC Den Bosch players
AZ Alkmaar players
Eredivisie players
Eerste Divisie players
Association football forwards
People from Groesbeek
Footballers from Gelderland